Vítor Manuel Carvalho Oliveira (born 15 March 2000), also known as Vitinha, is a Portuguese professional footballer who plays as a forward for Ligue 1 club Marseille.

Club career

Braga
Oliveira was born in Cabeceiras de Basto, Braga District. In his first season as a senior, 2020–21, he scored nine goals in only 11 matches for Braga's reserves in the third division.

On 18 January 2021, Oliveira signed a professional contract until 2024. He made his Primeira Liga debut for the first team on 28 February, coming on as a late substitute for Abel Ruiz in a 2–1 away win against Nacional.

Oliveira scored his first goal in the Portuguese top flight on 25 October 2021, the only in the fixture at Gil Vicente. The following month, in the fourth round of the Taça de Portugal, he netted four times in a 6–0 home victory over Santa Clara; he completed his hat-trick in the first 15 minutes of the game.

On 30 December 2021, Oliveira scored three goals in the first half of an eventual 6–0 away rout of Arouca. The following 10 March, again after having replaced Ruiz, he closed the 2–0 home defeat of Monaco in the round of 16 of the UEFA Europa League with an 89th-minute header.

On 13 October 2022, Oliveira scored three times in a 3–3 away draw against Union Saint-Gilloise in the Europa League group stage.

Marseille
On the last day of the 2023 January transfer window, Oliveira signed a four-and-a-half-year contract with Marseille, with the €32 million fee breaking Braga's previous record of €31 when Barcelona purchased Francisco Trincão three years earlier. He made his Ligue 1 debut on 5 February, playing the first half of an eventual 1–3 home loss against Nice.

International career
Oliveira made his debut for Portugal at under-21 level on 16 November 2021, replacing Gonçalo Ramos at the hour-mark of a 6–0 win against Cyprus in the 2023 UEFA European Championship qualifiers. He scored three goals during that stage, in away victories over Belarus (5–1) and Liechtenstein (9–0).

In October 2022, Oliveira was named in a preliminary 55-man squad for the 2022 FIFA World Cup in Qatar.

Style of play
A complete striker with physical strength, which allows him to excel at protecting the ball and turning around to attack the goal, Oliveira also possesses speed with and without the ball, mobility and a good positional sense.

Career statistics

Club

Honours
Braga
Taça de Portugal: 2020–21

References

External links

2000 births
Living people
Sportspeople from Braga District
Portuguese footballers
Association football forwards
Primeira Liga players
Campeonato de Portugal (league) players
S.C. Braga B players
S.C. Braga players
Ligue 1 players
Olympique de Marseille players
Portugal youth international footballers
Portugal under-21 international footballers
Portuguese expatriate footballers
Expatriate footballers in France
Portuguese expatriate sportspeople in France